Har gow (sometimes anglicized as "ha gow", "haukau", "hakao") is a traditional Cantonese dumpling served as dim sum.

Name
The dumpling is sometimes called a shrimp bonnet for its pleated shape. This dish is often served together with siumaai; when served in such a manner the two items are collectively referred to as gar gow-siu mai.

Har gow, siu mai, cha siu bao, and egg tarts are considered the classic dishes of Cantonese cuisine and referred to as The Four Heavenly Kings.. 

The name in Cantonese also means "wedding gown" as the shape of the dumpling resembles the traditional gown worn by a woman on her wedding day.

Description
These shrimp dumplings are transparent and smooth. The prawn dumplings first appeared in Guangzhou outskirts near the creek bazaar Deli. This dish is said to be the one that the skill of a dim sum chef is judged on. Traditionally, ha gow should have at least seven and preferably ten or more pleats imprinted on its wrapper. The skin must be thin and translucent, yet be sturdy enough not to break when picked up with chopsticks. It must not stick to the paper, container or the other ha gow in the basket. The shrimp must be cooked well, but not overcooked. The amount of meat should be generous, yet not so much that it cannot be eaten in one bite.

See also

 Dim sum
 Shumai

References

Cantonese cuisine
Cantonese words and phrases
Dim sum
Dumplings
Hong Kong cuisine
Shrimp dishes